Gil Itzhak (born 29 June 1993) is an Israeli professional footballer who plays as a forward for Israeli Club Hapoel Umm al-Fahm.

Club career
Itzhak made his professional debut with Bnei Yehuda Tel Aviv on 8 December 2012 in a 2–0 win against F.C. Ashdod. On 13 April 2013, he scored his debut goal in a 2–2 draw against Maccabi Tel Aviv.

International career
Itzhak made his debut for the Israel U-21 on 13 August 2013 in a 3–1 win. On 15 October 2013, he scored his debut goal in a 3–1 win against Norway.

Honours
 Bnei Yehuda Tel Aviv
Liga Leumit: 2014–15

 Maccabi Sha'arayim
Liga Alef: 2015–16

References

External links

1993 births
Living people
Israeli footballers
Association football forwards
Israel under-21 international footballers
Bnei Yehuda Tel Aviv F.C. players
Maccabi Sha'arayim F.C. players
Hapoel Rishon LeZion F.C. players
Hapoel Tel Aviv F.C. players
Hapoel Kfar Saba F.C. players
Maccabi Netanya F.C. players
Hapoel Umm al-Fahm F.C. players
Israeli Premier League players
Liga Leumit players
Israeli people of Yemeni-Jewish descent
Footballers from Tel Aviv